Liptena decempunctata is a butterfly in the family Lycaenidae. It is found in Cameroon.

References

Butterflies described in 1923
Liptena
Endemic fauna of Cameroon
Butterflies of Africa